Heeley railway station was a railway station in Sheffield, England. The station served the communities of Heeley, Meersbrook and Lowfield and was situated on the Midland Main Line near London Road on Heeley Bridge, lying between Sheffield Midland station and Millhouses railway station.

The station opened with the inauguration of the Midland Railway's main line between Chesterfield and Sheffield on 1 February 1870. This new station of 1870 was designed by the company architect John Holloway Sanders. It was built on an embankment between the A61, London Road South and the River Sheaf. During construction both the road and river were diverted to create space for the station and sidings. 

On 22 November 1876 an overnight passenger train from London St Pancras to Scotland via Carlisle derailed at Heeley due to a track defect, causing several people to be injured.

Initially the station had two platforms but this was increased to four when the line from Sheffield to Dore was widened between 1901 and 1903. Heeley station was the only station on this section of the line that was an elevated station with subway access from below to the platforms. 

During the Great Sheffield Gale in 1962, there was a near miss at the station as a London to Sheffield express train narrowly avoided crashing into debris blown onto the tracks by the devastating storm; the station itself suffered damage which was never fully repaired. Heeley station closed on 10 June 1968 at the same time as Millhouses railway station and all the platform buildings were demolished. The subway is still present although both entrances have been blocked in; the entrance on London Road can be seen and iron railings are present.

In July 2017, it was proposed by Local Enterprise Partnership that new stations should be built at Millhouses and Heeley as well as new platforms at Dore & Totley. The plans would be part of a call to have better links in South Yorkshire area as well as plans for a new Woodhead Route reopening.

References

External links 
 

Heeley
Disused railway stations in Sheffield
Railway stations in Great Britain opened in 1870
Railway stations in Great Britain closed in 1968
Former Midland Railway stations
Beeching closures in England
John Holloway Sanders railway stations
1876 disasters in the United Kingdom